Filip Moldoveanul (Philip the Moldavian) printed in the Transylvanian city of Sibiu the so-called Catehismul Lutheran (the Lutheran Catechism) in 1544, the first book printed in the Romanian language.

In 1550, he also printed the first Slavonic-Romanian Tetravanghel (The Four Gospels), also in Sibiu.

Career 
Filip Moldoveanul was also known as Philip the Painter and was mentioned in 1521 as having been a liaison from the Sibiu Chancellery to the Romanian Countries. He was also noted as an envoy on missions sent to Radu Paisie, prince of Wallachia, from 1537 to 1539.

References 

Romanian printers